Nathan Davis (born March 25, 1974) is an American college basketball coach.  He was most recently the men's basketball coach at Bucknell University from 2015 to 2023.  Davis served as the head men's basketball coach at Randolph–Macon College from 2009 to 2015.

In eight seasons, Davis finished 129-115 as Bucknell's head coach. He led the Bison to the 2017 and 2018 NCAA Tournaments. On March 2, 2023, he was fired as head coach.

Head coaching record

References

External links
 Bucknell profile

1974 births
Living people
Basketball coaches from Maryland
Basketball players from Maryland
Bucknell Bison men's basketball coaches
College men's basketball head coaches in the United States
Emory and Henry Wasps men's basketball coaches
Navy Midshipmen men's basketball coaches
People from Bethesda, Maryland
Randolph–Macon Yellow Jackets men's basketball coaches
Randolph–Macon Yellow Jackets men's basketball players
American men's basketball players
Year of birth missing (living people)